Lasca is a 1919 American silent Western film directed by Norman Dawn and starring Frank Mayo, Edith Roberts and Arthur Jasmine. It is based on the 1882 poem Lasca by Frank Desprez.

Cast
Frank Mayo as Anthony Moreland
Edith Roberts as Lasca
Arthur Jasmine as Ricardo
Veola Harty as Clara Vane
Lloyd Whitlock as John Davis
Raymond Lee as Boy

References

External links

1919 Western (genre) films
American silent feature films
Silent American Western (genre) films
1910s English-language films
Films directed by Norman Dawn
American black-and-white films
Universal Pictures films
1910s American films